The Federal Government Employees Housing Authority was established Ordinance of President of Pakistan on 12th July, 2019 for planning and developing housing schemes. The Federal Minister for Housing & Works, Tariq Bashir Cheema is the Chairman of FGEHA. The Director General of FGEHA is Waseem Hayat Bajwa.

History 
Federal Government Employees Housing Foundation was established in 1989 (under Ministry of Housing & Works). It was registered as a guarantee limited company with Securities & Exchange Commission of Pakistan in 1990 and it has been established as Federal Government Employees Housing Authority by the President.

References 

Pakistan federal departments and agencies
Housing in Pakistan
Housing organizations